Ajmal Selab (born January 11, 1984) (Jangalak village, Panjshir) is a politician and lawyer from Afghanistan. He is a member of Jamiat-e-Islami Afghanistan and a close relative of Ahmad Zia Masoud.

Early life and education
Ajmal Selab was born on January 11, 1984, in the village of Jangalek, Panjshir. He entered the elementary school in Gholam Haider Khan High School in 1990 and graduated from Ustad Khalilullah Khalili High School in 2002. He started learning at, "Kardan Institute"  in the economics department.
After completing this training course, he was engaged in cooperation with the Institute (CHA) as the deputy of the relations office. At the same time, he was engaged in studying law and political science in Misbah Institute of Higher Education. Then, in 2008, he officially joined the Attorney General's Office of Investigation and Investigation.
After two years of working with the Attorney General in 2010, he resigned and started working as the secretary of the leader of the National Front of Afghanistan. In 2014, he completed his bachelor's degree at the Faculty of Law and Political Science in Kabul.
And in the same year, after the presidential election of Afghanistan, he started working as a special assistant to Ahmad Zia Masoud, the extraordinary representative of the president in matters of reforms and good governance.
After the differences between Ashraf Ghani Ahmadzai and Ahmad Zia Massoud, which led to the resignation of  Masoud, Selab continued his duties as the head of the office of Masoud in the office of the vice president of Jamiat-e-Islami Afghanistan.
On August 15, 2021, he left for Pakistan with a delegation of 11 people, including Masoud and other political leaders and politicians of the country, for peace talks. But these negotiation did not yield any results and the republican system of Afghanistan collapsed.

Political activities
In 2002, Selab became a member of the political party Jamiat-e-Islami Afghanistan. After the formation of National Front of Afghanistan in 2010, he joined this political movement. In 2018, he was a candidate for the country's parliament from the field of resistance. But after consulting with the elders of the country, he withdrew from his candidacy. After August 2021, Selab is engaged in political activities abroad.

Cultural activities
After the death of poet and mystic of Afghanistan Heydari wojoudi, Ajmal Selab took responsibility for the construction of his tomb. In 2021, newspaper announced that the work of this tomb has been completed. The country's poets and writers thanked Selab for the construction of this cultural building during several meetings.

References

1984 births
Afghan Tajik people
Politicians of Panjshir Province
Afghan Muslims
Living people